Ola Bjerkaas (born 1952) is a Norwegian politician.  He served as the acting County Governor of Nordland county from 2008 until 2009 while Hill-Marta Solberg was finishing up her term in the Parliament of Norway.

References

1952 births
Living people
County governors of Norway
County governors of Nordland